Karl Prantl (November 5, 1923 – October 8, 2010) was an Austrian sculptor.

Biography 
Prantl was born in Pöttsching in the Austrian state Burgenland. He studied from 1946 to 1952 with the painter Albert Paris Gütersloh at the Academy of Fine Arts Vienna in Vienna. As the stone sculptor he became he was an autodidact.

He was the founder of the International Sculpture Symposium. He held his first international symposium (Symposion Europaischer Bildhauer) with 8 participants in the old quarry Römersteinbruch in Sankt Margarethen im Burgenland. Prantl was invited to exhibit work in the Austrian Pavilion of the Venice Biennale in 1986.

Prantl died of a stroke at his home on October 8, 2010, a month before his 87th birthday.

Decorations and awards
1962: German Critics Prize for visual art
1968: City of Vienna Prize for Visual Arts
2005: Austrian Decoration for Science and Art
2007: Sparda-Bank West Award for Special Services to the Public Art
2008: Grand Austrian State Prize for Visual Arts

References

External links 
 Karl Prantl on artnet
 Lannan Sculptures at Palm Beach State College include "Meditation Stones" and "Marble Cube" by Karl Prantl 

1923 births
2010 deaths
Austrian sculptors
Austrian male sculptors
Academy of Fine Arts Vienna alumni
Recipients of the Austrian Decoration for Science and Art
Recipients of the Grand Austrian State Prize
Austrian contemporary artists